"This Family" is a 1996 single by Magnapop by Play It Again Sam Records on CD (catalogue number 450.0307.24 - BIAS 307 CD.)

Track listing
All songs written by Linda Hopper and Ruthie Morris
"This Family" (Mark Freegard Remix) – 3:28
"This Family" – 3:28

Personnel
Magnapop
Linda Hopper – lead vocals, art direction, photography
Ruthie Morris – lead guitar, backing vocals, art direction, photography
Shannon Mulvaney – bass guitar

Additional personnel
Josh Freese – drums
Geza X – production, engineering
Eddie Shryer of Future Disc – mastering

1996 singles
Magnapop songs
PIAS Recordings singles
Song recordings produced by Geza X
Songs written by Ruthie Morris
Songs written by Linda Hopper
1996 songs